Daffodil Records is a record label that was founded by American jazz singer Blossom Dearie in 1973. In addition to being one of the first independent labels founded by a woman, she was the label's only artist.

References

See also
 List of record labels

American record labels
Jazz record labels
American independent record labels